The Alexander Nevsky Cathedral is a Christian Orthodox church located in the city of Łódź, in central Poland. It was built in the late 19th century as a gift from the local industrialists to the small Orthodox community present in Łódź at the time. The church consists of many ornate elevations and has a richly decorated interior featuring an iconostasis manufactured in St. Petersburg.

History
The church was built during the period when Poland lost its independence and was divided between the German, Austro-Hungarian and Russian Empires. It was constructed in the Russian sector (Congress Poland) with the financial support from the local textile factory owners and the most prominent citizens who adhered to Judaism, Protestantism and Catholicism. The church was consecrated on 29 May 1884 by Archbishop Leontius the ordinary of Warsaw and Chełm Dioceses.

The orthodox church was designed and built in the Neo-Byzantine style in an octagonal shape. Stained glass windows and iconostasis, made from oak wood, with three doors are the main decorations of the church. Izrael Poznański, who financed the enclosure and fence around the church was also the founder of the iconostasis.

The building is located at 56 Jana Kilińskiego Street in Łódź, near Stanisław Moniuszko Park and Łódź Fabryczna railway station.

References

Cathedrals in Poland
Churches in Łódź
Eastern Orthodox churches in Poland
Lodz
Polish Orthodox cathedrals
Church buildings with domes
19th-century churches in Poland
19th-century Eastern Orthodox church buildings